Sir John Mordaunt, 7th Baronet (baptised 9 May 1734 – 18 November 1806) was an English politician who represented the constituency of Warwickshire.

Mordaunt was born the son of Sir Charles Mordaunt, 6th Baronet and educated at New College, Oxford. He succeeded his father as 7th Baronet in 1778.

Mordaunt was a Captain in the Warwickshire militia from 1759 to 1763 and a Groom of the Bedchamber from  1763 to 1793. He was elected unopposed as the MP for Warwickshire from 1793 to 1802.

Mordaunt died in 1806. He had married Elizabeth, the daughter and coheiress of Thomas Prowse of Compton Bishop, Somerset, with whom he had 2 sons and 6 daughters. Mordaunt was succeeded by his son Charles, who also became MP for Warwickshire in 1804.

References

1734 births
1806 deaths
Alumni of New College, Oxford
Mordaunt baronets
British MPs 1790–1796
British MPs 1796–1800
UK MPs 1801–1802
Members of the Parliament of Great Britain for English constituencies
Members of the Parliament of the United Kingdom for English constituencies